Zamoum is a surname. Notable people with the surname include:

 Fatma Zohra Zamoum (born 1967), Franco-Algerian writer, filmmaker, and educator
 Mohamed ben Zamoum (1795-1843), Algerian marabout and leader against French conquest of Algeria
 Omar ben Zamoum (1836-1898), Algerian leader against French conquest of Algeria

See also
 Laazib Zamoum, a town in Algeria

Arabic-language surnames